Lavizān is a north-eastern neighborhood of Tehran, the capital of Iran.

Lavizān area consists of a residential area and forested recreation area called Lavizān Forest Park. The neighborhoods surrounding Lavizan are Majidabad, Qanat-kosar, Qasemabad, Deh-e Narmak, Shian, Kuye Nobonyad, Ozgol and Qal'eue Sardar.

Citizens
Local people in Lavizan live in 1–3 stories apartments. The "Rezaian" lastname is very common among locals.

Landmarks and urban areas
Lavizan Forest Park is recreation area, people from Lavizan and Tehran use it. The area size is about 1100 hectares.

The neighborhoods surrounding Lavizan are Majidabad, Qanat-kosar, Qasemabad, Deh-e Narmak, Shian, Kuye Nobonyad, Ozgol and Qal'eue Sardar.

Shahid Rajaee University is the only higher-education center in this area.

There are two schools located in lavizan, Adab and Shahidan-e-Rezaian.

Military sites
There is a heavily fortified army garrison situated in Lavizān and today also a nuclear site is said to be situated in the area.

References

Neighbourhoods in Tehran